Outuan Township is a rural township in Jingzhou Miao and Dong Autonomous County, Hunan, China. The township is bordered to the north by Sanqiao Township, to the east by Quyang Town, to the southwest by Pingcha Town, to the west by Dunzhai Town of Jinping County, and to the southeast by Xinchang Town.

History
After the founding of the Communist State in 1950, it belonged to the South District. In 1956, Outuan Township was established. In 1958 it was renamed "Outuan People's Commune". In 1984 its name was changed to "Outuan Miao Ethnic Township". In 1987 it restored the original name "Outuan Township".

Administrative division
As of 2017, the township is divided into 11 villages: Outuan, Sanqiao, Tuanshan, Longtuan, Xinzhai, Tandong, Xinjie, Gaoying, Gaopo, Laoli, and Kangtou.

Geography
The Nantuanba Reservoir is the largest body of water in the township. The Dilichong Reservoir is a reservoir and the second largest body of water in the township.

The Sixiang River passes through the township north to south.

Economy
The township's economy is based on nearby mineral resources and agricultural resources. The minerals in the township are coal, gold and bauxite.

Transportation
The Provincial Highway S222 passes across the town northeast to southwest.

References

Townships of Huaihua
Jingzhou Miao and Dong Autonomous County